Brian Cooke (born 1937) is a British comedy writer who, along with co-writer Johnnie Mortimer, wrote scripts for and devised many of the top television sitcoms during the 1970s, including Man About the House, George and Mildred, and Robin's Nest.

Cooke also wrote and created the 1980s TV sitcom Keep It in the Family, starring Robert Gillespie and the late-1960s/early-1970s sitcom Father, Dear Father starring Patrick Cargill. Man About the House, George and Mildred, Robin's Nest, and Keep It in the Family were remade for American television as Three's Company, The Ropers, Three's a Crowd and Too Close for Comfort.

Early career 
He was born in Liverpool, Lancashire - now Merseyside. Starting off as a cartoonist during his term of national service, he soon began to sell strips to magazines and newspapers. He met Johnnie Mortimer at a cartoonists convention. They also wrote the screenplays for the film version of the play No Sex Please, We're British, and the movie versions of their series Man About the House and Father Dear Father.

Scriptwriter 
Earlier in his career, Cooke was a writer for the last series of the 1960s radio series Round the Horne and its short-lived successor Stop Messing About. He had much success in 2003-5 when he revived the format for a theatre tribute show, Round the Horne ... Revisited, which ran in the West End for 15 months and spawned three national tours. In 2004, it was made into a television film, with the original London cast, by BBC Four. Stop Messing About was also turned into a stage play in 2009.

References

External links

  (source: BBC)
 BBC Four interview with Brian Cooke 

1937 births
British comedy writers
British television writers
Living people
Writers from Liverpool